Gary Fletcher (born 12 February 1962) is a British fencer. He competed in the individual and team sabre events at the 1992 Summer Olympics. In 1990, he won the sabre title at the British Fencing Championships.

References

External links
 

1962 births
Living people
British male fencers
Olympic fencers of Great Britain
Fencers at the 1992 Summer Olympics
Sportspeople from Ashton-under-Lyne